Małgorzata Kożuchowska is a Polish actress.

Kożuchowski or Kożuchowska may also refer to:

Geography 
 Kożuchowski Młyn, a settlement in Warmian-Masurian Voivodeship
 Wólka Kożuchowska, a village in Masovian Voivodeship